The Japen rat (Rattus jobiensis) is a species of rodent in the family Muridae found only in Yapen, Biak-Supiori, and Owi islands  of West Papua, Indonesia.

References

Rattus
Rodents of New Guinea
Endemic fauna of New Guinea
Mammals of Western New Guinea
Rodents of Indonesia
Mammals described in 1935
Taxonomy articles created by Polbot